Malokazakkulovo (Bäläkäy Qaźaqqol) is a rural locality (a village) and the administrative centre of Amangildinsky Selsoviet, Uchalinsky District, Bashkortostan, Russia. The population was 309 as of 2010. There are 5 streets.

Geography 
Malokazakkulovo is located 55 km southwest of Uchaly (the district's administrative centre) by road. Amangildino is the nearest rural locality.

References 

Rural localities in Uchalinsky District